Manouchehr Esmaeili (28 March 1939 – 22 August 2022) was an Iranian voice actor. He was perhaps best known for dubbing Frank Sinatra in the 1960 film Ocean's 11. He also dubbed Peter Falk's title character in Columbo, Falk, Terry-Thomas and Buddy Hackett in It's a Mad, Mad, Mad, Mad World, and Sidney Poitier and Rod Steiger in In the Heat of the Night. 

Esmaeili was born in Kermanshah on 28 March 1929. He dubbed in over 200 American films and television programs on lead and supporting roles. He died in August 2022 of a cardiac arrest at his home in Tehran, at the age of 83.

References 

1939 births
2022 deaths
20th-century Iranian male actors
21st-century Iranian male actors
Iranian Kurdish people
Iranian male voice actors
Iranian voice directors
People from Kermanshah